Horace Sandford (14 October 1891 – 16 August 1967) was an Australian cricketer. He played ten first-class cricket matches for Victoria between 1912 and 1931.

See also
 List of Victoria first-class cricketers

References

External links
 

1891 births
1967 deaths
Australian cricketers
Victoria cricketers
Cricketers from Sydney